Adrian Moore may refer to:

 Adrian Moore (composer) (born 1969), British musician
 Adrian Moore (actor), French actor, known for Mia and Me and Certified Copy (film)
 Adrian Moore, television series character on Nip/Tuck; see list of characters
A. W. Moore (philosopher)